Vougeot is a commune in the Côte-d'Or department and Bourgogne-Franche-Comté region of eastern France. The name itself derives from that of the little river Vouge. Cîteaux Abbey established these vineyards in the 12th century, laying the foundation for their long-standing reputation Their claim to fame is due at least partly to the fact that, rather unusually for the Côte de Nuits, Vougeot produces white wines (Chardonnay) as well as red (Pinot Noir).The appellation was formally instituted in 1936.

Population

Wine

The historical wall-enclosed Grand Cru vineyard Clos Vougeot is situated within the commune and makes up most of its vineyard surface.

Notable people
Vintner Jean-Charles Boisset was born in Vougeot.

See also
Clos Vougeot
Communes of the Côte-d'Or department
Route des Grands Crus

References

Communes of Côte-d'Or